Teso or TESO may refer to:

Places
 Têso, a Portuguese hamlet 
 Teso District, Kenya, a defunct administrative district in the former Western Province of Kenya
 Teso District, Uganda, a district in Uganda now known as Teso sub-region

Companies and organisations
 Royal TESO, a private ferry company operating the only public boat service to and from the Dutch Wadden island of Texel
 Baco Sacco Teso, a sacco in Teso offering services to the Teso people

Language
 Teso language, a Nilo-Saharan language
 Teso-Turkana languages, a cluster of Eastern Nilotic languages

Others
 Teso people, an ethnic group in eastern Uganda and western Kenya
 Fruko y sus Tesos, a salsa group from Colombia
 Iteso (or Teso), an ethnic group in Uganda (eastern) and Kenya (western)
 TESO (Austrian hacker group), a hacker group
 Teso Dos Bichos, the eighteenth episode of the third season of the American television drama, The X-Files
 Tamil Eelam Supporters Organization (TESO)
 The Elder Scrolls Online, a massively multiplayer online role-playing game
 Western Institute of Technology and Higher Education (in Spanish: ITESO, Universidad Jesuita de Guadalajara (Instituto Tecnológico y de Estudios Superiores de Occidente), a Jesuit university in the Western Mexican state of Jalisco, located in the municipality of Tlaquepaque in the Guadalajara Metropolitan Area, Mexico